Fathia Amaimia (born 5 September 1989) is a Tunisian Paralympic athlete of short stature. She competes in F41-classification throwing events. She represented Tunisia at the 2016 Summer Paralympics in Rio de Janeiro, Brazil and she won the bronze medal in the women's discus throw F41 event. She also competed in the women's shot put F41 event where she finished in 6th place.

At the 2013 IPC Athletics World Championships held in Lyon, France, she won the silver medal in the women's discus throw F41 event. Two years later, at the 2015 IPC Athletics World Championships in Doha, Qatar, she also won a silver medal in the same event. In 2019, she finished in 8th place in the women's shot put F41 event at the 2019 World Para Athletics Championships held in Dubai, United Arab Emirates.

References

External links 
 

1989 births
Living people
Tunisian female discus throwers
Paralympic athletes of Tunisia
Athletes (track and field) at the 2016 Summer Paralympics
Medalists at the 2016 Summer Paralympics
Competitors in athletics with dwarfism
Place of birth missing (living people)
Paralympic medalists in athletics (track and field)
Paralympic bronze medalists for Tunisia
21st-century Tunisian women